CJSQ-FM is a French-language Canadian radio station located in Quebec City, Quebec, broadcasting on 92.7 MHz using an omnidirectional antenna with an effective radiated power of 2,840 watts (class B). The station broadcasts a French language classical music format branded as Radio-Classique Québec, and is owned by Groupe Musique Greg as a sister station to CJPX-FM, a classical music station serving Montreal.

The station was previously founded and owned by Radio-Classique Québec, Inc., a company that was 90% owned by Jean-Pierre Coallier. While it was controlled by the same principal owners, the two companies are legally separate.

 In December 2014, it was announced that both CJSQ and CJPX would be sold to Groupe Musique Greg, a company founded by Montreal musician and radio personality Gregory Charles. Charles' offer to buy the two stations came in response to rumours that Coallier was looking to retire and sell them.

Under Charles' ownership, the station broadcasts a selection of orchestral music, jazz and chanson. Most of the programming is simulcast with CJPX-FM, with Béatrice Zacharie and Jasmin Hains originating from CJSQ-FM and simulcast in Montreal on CJPX-FM.

In April 2020, Leclerc Communication, owners of competing station CJEC-FM, acquired CJPX-FM; that station would flip to an adult contemporary format as WKND 99.5, breaking off the simulcast with CJSQ-FM.

References

External links
 
 
 

Jsq
Jsq
Jsq
Radio stations established in 2007
2007 establishments in Quebec